Klára Černá (born 29 January 1985) is a Czech handball player for Slavia Prague and the Czech national team.

References

1985 births
Living people
Czech female handball players
Sportspeople from Pardubice
21st-century Czech women